UFC 22: Only One Can be Champion was a mixed martial arts event held by the Ultimate Fighting Championship on September 24, 1999 at the Lake Charles Civic Center in Lake Charles, Louisiana.

History
The event was headlined by a Light Heavyweight Championship bout between Frank Shamrock and Tito Ortiz. The Ortiz-Shamrock fight was notable for being widely considered one of the best MMA fights ever at the time it took place, due to the complete range of skills shown by both fighters. The bout featured back-and-forth action which saw multiple takedowns from Ortiz and crisp kickboxing displayed by Shamrock, who eventually forced Ortiz into submission with brutal punches, elbows, and hammerfists to the temple late in the 4th round. Shamrock would begin his short lived semi-retirement after this bout, citing a lack of competition.

UFC 22 marked the first UFC appearance of future UFC Welterweight Champion Matt Hughes, who would go on to dominate the UFC's Welterweight division, as well as future UFC Lightweight Championship Jens Pulver, who fought in a preliminary bout that was not televised.

Brad Kohler scored one of the more infamous knockouts in MMA history. 30 seconds into Round 1, Kohler feigned a takedown attempt, only to land an explosive right cross. Steve Judson was knocked out instantly, and suffered a deep gash to his chin at the point of impact. Remaining unconscious and showing signs of having difficulty breathing, referees immediately signaled to the medical staff who administered oxygen treatment to Judson, who was taken out via stretcher to the local hospital.

The event was the second to feature rounds following the significant rule changes first introduced in UFC 21.

Results

See also 
 Ultimate Fighting Championship
 List of UFC champions
 List of UFC events
 1999 in UFC

External links
 UFC official website

References

Ultimate Fighting Championship events
1999 in mixed martial arts
Mixed martial arts in Louisiana
Sports in Lake Charles, Louisiana
1999 in sports in Louisiana